Peter Joos (born 14 August 1961) is a Belgian fencer. He competed in the individual and team foil events at the 1984 Summer Olympics. His brother, Stefan Joos, also fenced for Belgium at the 1984 Games.

References

External links
 

1961 births
Living people
Belgian male fencers
Belgian foil fencers
Olympic fencers of Belgium
Fencers at the 1984 Summer Olympics
Sportspeople from Brussels